Jeff Carr is an American Democratic politician from Eagle Nest, New Mexico.  He has taught in public education for more than 27 years, worked as a stock broker, commercial insurance agent and a nuclear weapons specialist.  He has also served as a municipal judge and the Mayor Pro-Tem of Eagle Nest, New Mexico.  

Carr ran for the position of Lieutenant Governor in New Mexico's 2018 gubernatorial election.

Carr is a registered Independent and wants "to be an active proponent of education."

References

External links
 Jeff Carr - Ballotpedia

Year of birth missing (living people)
Living people